Hortense is an unincorporated community and census-designated place (CDP) in Brantley County, Georgia, United States. It is part of the Brunswick, Georgia Metropolitan Statistical Area. Its ZIP code is 31543.

Hortense lies at an elevation of 56 feet (17 m), and contains the intersection of US 301 and GA 32.

Hickox was first listed as a CDP prior to the 2020 census with a population of 252.

Demographics

2020 census

Note: the US Census treats Hispanic/Latino as an ethnic category. This table excludes Latinos from the racial categories and assigns them to a separate category. Hispanics/Latinos can be of any race.

References

Unincorporated communities in Brantley County, Georgia
Census-designated places in Brantley County, Georgia